Huaguoshan station is a metro station on Line 12 of Shenzhen Metro. It was opened on November 28, 2022.

Station layout
The station has an island platform under Nanhai Road.

Exits

References

External links

 Shenzhen Metro Official Page (Chinese)

Railway stations in Shenzhen
Railway stations in Guangdong
Nanshan District, Shenzhen
Railway stations opened in 2022